Return To Gone-Away  is a children's book  written by Elizabeth Enright, which is the sequel to the book Gone-Away Lake and discusses how the Blake family buys a house in Gone-Away. The book was first published in 1961.

Plot introduction
When Portia learns of her parents buying Villa Caprice, a tumbledown Victorian house close to Gone-Away Lake, she is excited.  She, her brother Foster and her cousin Julian enjoy learning about the "new" old house, with the help of elderly neighbors Mr. Payton and Mrs. Cheever.

References

External links

See also

1961 American novels
American children's novels
1961 children's books